Ioane Petritsi also referred as John Petritsi was a Georgian Neoplatonist philosopher of the 11th-12th century, active in the Byzantine Empire and Kingdom of Georgia, best known for his translations of Proclus, along with an extensive commentary. In later sources, he is also referred to as Ioane Chimchimeli. The Stanford Encyclopedia of Philosophy describes Petritsi as "the most significant Georgian medieval philosopher" and the "most widely read Georgian philosopher."

Life
There is no reliable information on Petritsi's biography except for indirect indications in his own works and a few details provided by 18th-century Georgian scholarship. He is reported to have been born into an aristocratic family from the province of Samtskhe, and educated at Constantinople under the tutelage of Michael Psellos and John Italus. After the fall of Italus, Ioane seems to have fled to the Georgian monastery of Petritsoni in Bulgaria, whence comes his epithet Petritsi. He translated many philosophical works, principally Neoplatonic, with the aim of reconciling the Classical ideas with the principal message of Christianity. His broad philosophic outlook brought him into collision with the Georgian patristic orthodoxy, until the king David IV of Georgia eventually established him at Gelati Academy. He translated Aristotle, Proclus, Nemesius, Ammonius Hermiae, components of the Bible, hagiography, and some other pieces. Of his few original works, an extensive commentary to Proclus and Neoplatonism is the most important. But he also composed ascetic and mystic poetry, and hymns.

Both in his philosophy and his literary style, Petritsi had a long lasting influence on Georgian philosophic thought and literature, which became more prominent in the 18th century under the reformist scholar Catholicos Anton I.

References

Further reading 
Gigineishvili, Levan (2007), The Platonic Theology of Ioane Petritsi. Gorgias Press, 
Gigineishvili, Levan The harmonisation of neoplatonism and christianity in the Gelati monastic school, Annual of Medieval Studies at the Central European University for 1994–1995, 1996, p. 124–139.
Iremadze, Tengiz, Joane Petrizi, Stanford Encyclopedia of Philosophy, 2006
Iremadze, Tengiz, Konzeptionen des Denkens im Neuplatonismus. Zur Rezeption der Proklischen Philosophie im deutschen und georgischen Mittelalter: Dietrich von Freiberg – Berthold von Moosburg – Joane Petrizi (Bochumer Studien zur Philosophie, Bd. 40), Amsterdam – Philadelphia: B. R. Grüner Publishing Company, 2004.
Hans-Christian Günther, Die Übersetzungen der Elementatio theologica des Proklos und ihre Bedeutung für den Proklostext, Einige vorläufige Bemerkungen zur Bedeutung von Petrizis Übersetzung der Elementatio für die Textkonstitution, Leyde, E. J. Brill, 2007
Lela Alexidze, Ioane Petritsi und die antike Philosophie, Tbilissi, 2008
Lela Alexidze & Lutz Bergemann, Ioane Petrizi. Kommentar zur Elementatio theologica des Proklos, Amsterdam, B. Grüner, 2009
Lela Alexidze, Griechische Philosophie in den Kommentaren des Joane Petrizi zur Elementatio theologica des Proklos, Oriens Christianus 81, 1997, p. 148-168
Chelidze, Edisher,  Über das Leben und das Wirken von Ioane Petrizi, In: Religion. 3-4-5, 1994, S. 113–126.
Khuroshvili, Giorgi, Jerusalem and Athens in Medieval Georgian Thought, in: Philosophie und Sozialtheorie, Band 1, Leben verstehen. Herausgegeben von T. Iremadze, U. R. Jeck, H. Schneider. Logos Verlag, Berlin, 2014. S. 97–101.

External links

11th-century philosophers
12th-century philosophers
Philosophers from Georgia (country)
Neoplatonists
Year of birth unknown
Year of death unknown
Bachkovo Monastery